Ken Otremba (October 29, 1948 – September 4, 1997) was an American politician and a member of the Minnesota House of Representatives representing District 11B, which includes portions of Douglas and Todd counties in the west central part of the state. A Democrat, Otremba was elected to two terms in office, dying of liver cancer during the second.

Otremba served as a fire control technician in the United States Navy during the Vietnam War, and later served in government, serving as an officer for the township of Reynolds, and as a commissioner for Todd County.

Otremba, a farmer, was married to Mary Ellen Otremba, who succeeded him in office. The two had four children. His cousin was Steve Dehler who also served in the Minnesota Legislature.

References

External links 

1948 births
1997 deaths
People from Todd County, Minnesota
Military personnel from Minnesota
Farmers from Minnesota
County commissioners in Minnesota
Democratic Party members of the Minnesota House of Representatives
20th-century American politicians